The PLL-05 is a Chinese self-propelled gun-mortar in use by Chinese mechanised infantry formations. Conceptually it is similar to the Russian 2S23 "Nona-SVK" (the turret and weapon system of the 2S9 Nona mounted on a BTR-80 chassis) three of which China purchased for evaluation; at one time it was reported that China would purchase 100 of the Russian vehicles however this failed to occur, nor does it appear that there was a formal transfer of technology to China. The Chinese system features a longer barreled weapon mounted on the Type 92 variant of the WZ551 armored personnel carrier.

The gun-mortar is a lighter and more compact artillery piece than the traditional gun-howitzer at the expense of maximum range, and which has the advantage of better accuracy,  higher rate of fire and capability of direct fire in comparison to standard infantry mortars.

Description

The main armament of the PLL-05 is a 120 mm gun-mortar in a turret capable of 360° traverse, this turret being mounted on a 6x6 WZ551 armored personnel carrier chassis. The mortar has an elevation range of -4° to +80° and is capable of both direct and indirect fire. It is fitted with an autoloader and can be fired in fully automatic, semi-automatic and fully manual modes, the maximum rate of fire being around 8-10 rounds per minute, with a sustained rate of fire being about 4-6 rounds per minute. Secondary armament is a 12.7×108mm QJC-88 heavy machine gun mounted on the turret roof. The crew of four consists of the vehicle commander, gunner, loader and driver. Mobility of the PPL-05 is similar to that of that base WZ551 and the vehicle can swim by way of two rear-mounted propellers.

History
The existence of the PLL-05 was first revealed in 2001 with the system entering service some years later. The PLL-05 was one of the systems that participated in the military parade as part of the 60th anniversary of the People's Republic of China celebrations.

The turret of the PLL-05 was reused on the Type 07PA, a self-propelled gun designed for export.

Operators

 People's Liberation Army Ground Force - approximately 500 units of PLL-05 as of 2021.

References

The Chinese and Russian articles on this subject were used as the basis for performance details in this article

External links

Self-propelled artillery of the People's Republic of China
120 mm artillery
120mm mortars
Gun-mortars
Military vehicles introduced in the 2000s